The common rock thrush (Monticola saxatilis), also known as rufous-tailed rock thrush or simply rock thrush, is a chat belonging to the family Muscicapidae. It was formerly placed in the family Turdidae. The scientific name is from  Latin. Monticola is from  mons, montis "mountain", and colere, "to dwell", and saxatilis means "rock-frequenting", from saxum, "stone" .

It breeds in southern Europe across  Central Asia to northern China. This species is strongly migratory, all populations wintering in Africa south of the Sahara. It is an uncommon visitor to northern Europe. Its range has contracted somewhat at the periphery in recent decades due to habitat destruction. For example, in the early 20th century it bred in the Jura Krakowsko-Częstochowska (Poland) where none occur today, but it is not considered globally endangered.

Description

This is a medium-sized but stocky thrush 17–20 cm in length. The summer male is unmistakable, with a blue-grey head, orange underparts and outer tail feathers, dark brown wings and white back. Females and immatures are much less striking, with dark brown scaly upperparts, and paler brown scaly underparts. The outer tail feathers are reddish, like the male.

Behaviour and ecology

This species breeds in open dry hilly areas, usually above 1500 m. It nests in rock cavities, laying 4–5 eggs. It is omnivorous, eating a wide range of insects, berries and small reptiles. The male common rock thrush has a clear and tuneful song.

Gallery

References

External links

Oiseaux Photos, map, text.
Ageing and sexing (PDF; 1.2 MB) by Javier Blasco-Zumeta & Gerd-Michael Heinze
Handbook of the Birds of the World
BirdGuides
Macaulay Library
Mangoverde; direct link here

common rock thrush
Birds of Eurasia
Birds of East Africa
common rock thrush
Taxa named by Carl Linnaeus